Petros Routzieris (born 4 January 1973) is a Greek professional football manager and former player.

References

1973 births
Living people
Greek footballers
Proodeftiki F.C. players
Athinaikos F.C. players
Chalkidona F.C. players
Diagoras F.C. players
Super League Greece players
Greek football managers
Diagoras F.C. managers
Association football defenders
People from Rhodes
Sportspeople from the South Aegean
21st-century Greek people